is a 2013 Japanese supernatural horror film directed by Tsutomu Hanabusa and the sequel to 2012's Sadako 3D and the final installment in the Rasen timeline.

Plot

Takanori Andō (Kōji Seto) is waiting while Akane Ayukawa is giving birth to their daughter. Seiji Kashiwada's landlord sitting in a garden reads Kashiwada's letters and mutters that the girl is born. Another woman is accessing her laptop in her room when her husband calls her; she is suddenly possessed by a force from her laptop who forces her to commit suicide by stabbing her eye with a knife.

Five years after the events of the previous film, Takanori and Akane's daughter, Nagi (Kokoro Hirasawa) is cared for by Takanori's younger sister, Fuko (Miori Takimoto); Takanori himself is now working at Asakawa General Hospital since Akane's death by childbirth, distancing himself from Fuko and Nagi as he blames Nagi for Akane's death.

Fuko is certain that something is wrong with Nagi, as she distances herself from her friends, likes to draw strange imagery, and is always present near people who committed suicide. She consults with her psychiatrist, Dr. Fumika Kamimura (Itsumi Osawa), but she only states that Fuko's anxiety comes from the fact that she has not moved from her mother's suicide years ago, whose death she could not prevent. While playing at a park, one of Nagi's friends, Yuna, teases her about Akane's death. Moments later, she is found dead in the nearby river. Fuko becomes even more anxious as more deaths start to occur, from Nagi's babysitter to a train full of people, which Nagi had foreshadowed in her drawings she drew during her psychological test with Dr. Kamimura. She also says that Dr. Kamimura, as well as everyone else, will die.

Detective Mitsugi Kakiuchi (Takeshi Onishi) is assigned to investigate the case. He questions Detective Yugo Koiso (Ryosei Tayama), who is disabled following his own investigations of a similar case five years before. Koiso tells Kakiuchi that the suicides are linked to Sadako Yamamura, who almost possessed Akane as her vessel so she might be reborn in the world. Seconds later, a force pushes Koiso's wheelchair through a set of stairs to his death.

Kakiuchi finds the security camera recording before the train accident and spots Nagi looking at the camera. He tries to question Takanori about Nagi and Akane, but he refuses to disclose anything other than Akane's death. As he hurries up ahead, he accidentally drops his trash bags, revealing bundles of black hair. While Fuko is cleaning Takanori's room, she finds a locked up wardrobe that contains a photo of Takanori, Akane, and baby Nagi, as well as several letters for Takanori from Seiji Kashiwada asking Nagi's well-being.

Fuko visits Kashiwada (Yusuke Yamamoto), the latter awaiting his execution for his murder of young women five years before. Describing himself as Nagi's "fan", Kashiwada reveals that Nagi is not Akane's child, but Sadako's, and that the only way to stop Nagi is for Fuko to kill herself or to kill Nagi. On the way home, Fuko receives a call from Dr. Kamimura asking her to meet her, but finds that she has been possessed, and while escaping from her attack, Fuko relives her experiences of seeing her mother's suicide and becomes cursed.

At home, Fuko experiences nightmares of Nagi and Takanori attacking her. She contemplates killing Nagi by throwing her into the sea, but decides not to. She meets Takanori and, after urging him to help Nagi, he shows Fuko that Akane (Satomi Ishihara) is still alive, albeit in a comatose state. He tells Fuko that since Sadako attempted to be reborn through Akane in the first film, Akane has allowed herself to be possessed by Sadako so she can fight her from the inside. Eventually, Akane became pregnant and delivered Nagi, but she can never reunite with her mother again lest Sadako be reborn. Takanori also reveals that Nagi is not responsible for the deaths.

The next day, Fuko discovers Nagi is missing, while Takanori finds her roaming in the Asakawa Hospital. He is attacked and brutally beaten by Kakiuchi, who wants to kill Nagi and Akane to stop the curse, revealing that his wife (the woman killed in the beginning) had died from the curse and he himself is also cursed. Nagi escapes and reunites with Fuko, who allows Nagi to reunite with her mother. However, Akane is shot before she could reach Nagi by Kakiuchi, who promptly commits suicide. As the whole room is flooded by blood pouring from Sadako's well, Nagi is taken by Sadako, but Fuko manages to save her.

Several days later, Fuko and Nagi have a picnic at a meadow, while Kashiwada's landlord, still sitting in the garden, reads Kashiwada's last letter before his execution. The film ends with the camera recording that Kakiuchi watches, which reveals that Sadako's child is not Nagi.

Cast
 Miori Takimoto as Fuko Ando, a young woman who takes care of her niece, Nagi, following her brother's abandonment.
 Kōji Seto as Takanori Ando, Fuko's older brother who blames his daughter, Nagi, for his lover's death.
 Itsumi Osawa as Fumika Kamimura, Fuko's psychiatrist.
 Kokoro Hirasawa as Nagi Ando, Takanori and Akane's quiet daughter who is suspected of hosting Sadako's powers.
 Takeshi Onishi as Mitsugi Kakiuchi, a detective whose wife's death results in him taking Sadako's case.
 Yusuke Yamamoto as Seiji Kashiwada, an online artist working for Sadako. He is currently awaiting execution.
 Ryosei Tayama as Yugo Koiso, now-disabled detective who previously investigated Sadako's case in the previous film.
 Satomi Ishihara as Akane Ayukawa, Takanori's lover and Nagi's mother, who has been hosting Sadako since the end of the previous film.

See also
 List of ghost films

References

External links
Official website 
 
 

2013 films
Japanese supernatural horror films
2013 horror films
Japanese 3D films
2013 3D films
Films directed by Tsutomu Hanabusa
Films scored by Kenji Kawai
2010s Japanese films
2010s Japanese-language films